Zoltán Kelemen may refer to:
 Zoltán Kelemen (baritone) (1926–1979), Hungarian bass-baritone
 Zoltán Kelemen (figure skater) (born 1986), Romanian figure skater
 Zoltán Kelemen (gymnast) (born 1958), Hungarian artistic gymnast